is a 2001 Japanese film directed by Hideyuki Hirayama.

Cast
 Riho Makise as Maki Mori
 Nakamura Kantarō II as Yohei Izumi
 Mitsuko Baisho as Satoko Mori
 Kazuki Kitamura as Kiyotaka Kakizaki

Reception
One review said, "Turn manages to suffer most of the downsides of the twist ending."

References

External links
 

2001 films
2000s Japanese films
Films directed by Hideyuki Hirayama